is a 1998 Japanese drama film directed by Kiyoshi Kurosawa.

Cast 
 Hidetoshi Nishijima – Yutaka Yoshii
 Kōji Yakusho – Fujimori
 Shun Sugata – Shinichiro Yoshii
 Lily – Sachiko
 Kumiko Asō – Chizuru Yoshii
 Show Aikawa – Kazaki
 Yoriko Dōguchi – Miki
 Ren Osugi – Murota
 Hiromitsu Suzuki – Kurume
 Kōsuke Toyohara – Doctor
 Masahiro Toda – Akira Ueda

Reception
Stephen Holden at the New York Times stated that "the metaphysical humor it gleans from the situation marks Mr. Kurosawa (who is no relation to Akira Kurosawa) as a quirky, smart filmmaker." The critic Tom Mes wrote that the film "strays far off the beaten path, shunning the predictability of your average celluloid tragedy to deliver genuine laughs".

References

External links 

1998 drama films
1998 films
1990s Japanese-language films
Japanese drama films
1990s Japanese films